Harry Ellis (1878 – 6 July 1943) was a New Zealand cricketer. He played in six first-class matches for Canterbury and Hawke's Bay from 1904 to 1915.

References

External links
 

1878 births
1943 deaths
New Zealand cricketers
Canterbury cricketers
Hawke's Bay cricketers
Cricketers from Sydney